The  is a tram line serving the island of Shikoku, Japan, in the city of Kōchi, Kōchi Prefecture. This tram line is part of the Tosaden Kōtsū network.

The line name "Sanbashi Line" sometimes denotes only the section between Harimayabashi and Sanbashi-dōri-gochōme.

Stations

References

Rail transport in Kōchi Prefecture